The Church of San Juan Bautista or Arucas Church, is a Catholic church located in the old town of Arucas, in Gran Canaria, Canary Islands, Spain.

Construction began on 19 March 1909, and took over 68 years. The church was opened for public worship in 1917, but the construction continued until 1977, when the church was completed. Due to the large dimensions, it is usually referred to as The Arucas Cathedral even though it is not a cathedral.

References 
 Patrimonio Histórico de Arucas
 Vidrieras de la Iglesia de San Juan Bautista
 Web Parroquia San Juan Bautista Arucas

Buildings and structures in Las Palmas
Buildings and structures completed in 1977
Roman Catholic churches in the Canary Islands
Roman Catholic churches completed in 1977
20th-century Roman Catholic church buildings in Spain